This and of That is the fourth album by the American alternative rock band Chronic Future. It was released in 2006, and consisted of new songs, as well as several re-recorded versions of songs that had originally been recorded and released by the band on their website, which is currently inactive. The song "Shellshocked" from Lines in My Face was emulated into the band's new style from its previous rock style by Ryan Breen, former rhythm guitarist of the band. The album was limited to 1000 copies. The album was self-released, and produced by Ben Collins. The album featured Ryan Breen as a collaborating artist.

The album was the first album to feature the use of techno-style guitar and bass, creating a techno/alternative/hip-hop crossover style which Chronic Future adopted as their primary style.

Track listing

Personnel

Members
Mike Busse - lead vocals, backing vocals
Ben Collins - lead vocals on tracks 3, 5 and 10, guitar, backing vocals
Brandon Lee - lead vocals, bass guitar, backing vocals
Barry Collins - drums, percussion

Other Personnel
Ryan Breen - programming

References

2006 albums
Chronic Future albums